Fatman is a 2020 American black comedy action film written and directed by Eshom Nelms and Ian Nelms and starring Mel Gibson, Walton Goggins and Marianne Jean-Baptiste. An unorthodox slant on holiday traditions that follows a jaded, gritty Santa Claus who struggles often with ennui, production issues, Government interference, and now an embittered assassin sent by a vengeful naughty kid.

Filmed in Canada and released worldwide on November 13, 2020, the film received mixed reviews from critics.

Plot
Chris Kringle and his wife Ruth operate a Christmas present workshop on an old isolated farm near the small town of North Peak, Alaska. Struggling with declining income over the years due to children becoming increasingly vicious, the United States Government,  who maintains an interest share in Chris's business because Christmas is a major economic stimulus, starts cutting back on their subsidies. To remedy Chris' income loss, US military Captain Jacobs is sent to propose a two-month contract for producing jet fighter components which is outright refused. The liaison agents override Chris's misgivings by implying next year Government's subsidies will likely decrease and their next offer might not be as "sweet". Ruth intervenes and manages to restore Chris's spirits and grudgingly accept their offer only this one time.

The plot then follows Billy Wenan, an amoral pernicious child who lives with his old money grandmother and is the quintessential vicious child who commits several despicable acts against people he considers inferiors. On Christmas Eve, Billy receives a lump of coal from Chris and rather than seeing this as his just reward is affronted and swears revenge on the “fatman”. Billy then hires his oft used personal hit man, Jonathan Miller, to assassinate Chris. Miller, who also harbors a bitter childhood grudge against Chris, gladly accepts and sets off on a killing spree until he successfully coerces a Postal Service supervisor for Chris's confidential postal address. Making his way to North Peak, Miller stalks Chris to the farm and covertly infiltrates Chris's workshop until an elf raises the alarm. Now uncovered, Miller kills most of the US Army guards, Captain Jacobs, and lastly blows up the workshop.

In a final standoff, Chris calls out Miller by name to stop his twisted ways and gains the upper hand in their fight, but Miller fatally wounds Chris using a hidden blade and then shoots Chris dead. Ruth afterwards shoots Miller dead. As Ruth and the elves weep over Chris, he begins to move and begins recovering from his injuries. Backtracking Miller's assignment, Chris and Ruth pay a visit to Billy and interrupt him poisoning his grandmother’s milk to cover his check forgeries. Irritated, Chris drinks the milk, identifies the poison, further indicating that he does not succumb to injury or illness, an earlier scene showing a bullet wound having healed perfectly first indicates this, and admits he has become lax when dealing with children like Billy. Chris warns Billy that from now on he will come for vicious children in the night as they sleep if they harm people. Back at the workshop, Chris, Ruth, and the elves start rebuilding the workshop bigger and better with renewed confidence in the future.

Cast
 Mel Gibson as Chris Cringle, who is frustrated with the world turning into an unruly place and not above wielding guns to defend himself
 Walton Goggins as Jonathan Miller (credited as "Skinny Man"), a hitman who works in a toy store and has a personal grudge against Chris for "letting him down" in his unhappy childhood
 Marianne Jean-Baptiste as Ruth Kringle, Chris' loving wife and moderating influence
 Chance Hurstfield as Billy Wenan, an amoral rich kid who is neglected by his father and cannot stand to lose
 Robert Bockstael as Captain Jacobs, the commander of the US Army guards assigned to Chris' workshop and his liaison to the US government
 Eric Woolfe as Elf 7, Chris' foreman in the workshop
 Susanne Sutchy as Sandy, a friend of Chris Kringle and barkeeper in North Peak
 Deborah Grover as Anne Marie, Billy's wealthy grandmother whose accounts are secretly fleeced by her grandson to finance his assignments for Miller

Production
Ian and Eshom Nelms originally wrote the screenplay for Fatman in 2006, and had been shopping it around for over 10 years. On May 8, 2019, it was announced that Gibson would play Santa Claus in the film. On January 29, 2020, it was announced that Walton Goggins had joined the cast, and Marianne Jean-Baptiste joined the following month.

Principal photography occurred in the Ottawa Valley (Ontario and Quebec, Canada) and in the towns of Carleton Place and Mississippi Mills in February 2020. The climactic shootout sequence took four days to film, with the temperature hitting as low as 36 below zero Celsius.

Release
Saban Films acquired the film's United States distribution rights in September 2020. It was released in the United States in select theaters on November 13, 2020. It also received a limited release in Australia on November 19, 2020.

Fatman was released via digital download on November 17, 2020.  It was also released on video-on-demand on November 24, 2020.

Reception

Box office and VOD 
In its opening weekend, the film grossed $108,000 from 259 theaters. In its second weekend the film made $51,266 from 177 theaters, and was also the third-most rented film on FandangoNow, Spectrum, and Apple TV, and fourth on Google Play. It remained in the top four spots on all four platforms the following weekend, while also grossing $11,895 from 42 theaters.

Critical response 
On Metacritic, the film has a weighted average score of 40 out of 100, based on 24 critics, indicating "mixed or average reviews". The website's critics consensus reads, "Fatman takes a surprisingly serious approach to a potentially ludicrous twist on the Santa Claus legend, aiming for edgy but mostly missing the mark."

John DeFore of The Hollywood Reporter gave the film a positive review and wrote, "Less gonzo than it sounds, for better and worse." Julian Roman of MovieWeb also gave the film a positive review and wrote, "Fatman reflects the worst instincts of modern times. It shows how selfishness and immorality can lead to violent outcomes." Hunter Lanier of Film Threat gave the film a 7 out of 10.  Chris Bumbray of JoBlo.com gave the film an 8 out of 10.

Bill Goodykoontz of The Arizona Republic awarded the film two stars.  Chuck Bowen of Slant Magazine awarded the film one and a half stars out of four. Owen Gleiberman of Variety gave the film a negative review and wrote, "Yet you get the distinct feeling that the Nelms brothers think this is all a lot funnier, crazier, and more resonant than it is."

Alonso Duralde of TheWrap also gave the film a negative review and wrote, "It never makes it past the idea stage, unfortunately, since mixing these disparate genres together would require an absolute mastery of tone that the film can't quite muster." David Ehrlich of IndieWire graded the film a D, saying "Combining the crude spirit of Bad Santa with the grittiness of a Zack Snyder film, Fatman is worse than a lump of coal in your stocking."

See also
List of Christmas films

References

External links
 

2020 films
2020 black comedy films
2020 action comedy films
American black comedy films
2020s Christmas comedy films
American Christmas films
American films about revenge
Films set in Alaska
Films shot in Ottawa
Saban Films films
Santa Claus in film
2020s English-language films
2020s American films